This is a list of episodes of the show The Amazing World of Gumball.

Series overview

Episodes

Pilot (2008)

Season 1 (2011–12)

Season 2 (2012–13)

Season 3 (2014–15)

Season 4 (2015–16)

Season 5 (2016–17)

Season 6 (2018–19)

Specials

Darwin's Yearbook
A six-episode special called Darwin's Yearbook aired on Cartoon Network in December 2019. The miniseries features Darwin attempting to complete Elmore Junior High's yearbook by examining who he thinks should fill up the best spot. The miniseries is essentially a collection of clip show episodes.

The Gumball Chronicles 
An eight-episode miniseries called The Gumball Chronicles premiered on Cartoon Network on October 5, 2020. Though primarily a clip show with scenes from previous episodes, however the miniseries features some new content. Within the miniseries, there is a 4-part special titled Vote Gumball themed around the 2020 United States presidential election.

Every episode is written and directed by Richard Overall.

Notes

References

External links
 
 Official page for The Amazing World of Gumball at Cartoon Network
 
 The Amazing World of Gumball at epguides
 The Amazing World of Gumball at The Encyclopedia of Science Fiction

Episodes
Lists of British animated television series episodes
Lists of American children's animated television series episodes
2010s television-related lists
Lists of Cartoon Network television series episodes